Shirley Ann Richards (13 December 1917 – 25 August 2006) was an Australian actress and author, who achieved notability in a series of 1930s Australian films for Ken G. Hall before moving to the United States, where she continued her career as a film actress, mainly as a Metro-Goldwyn-Mayer starlet. Her best known performances were in It Isn't Done (1937), Dad and Dave Come to Town (1938), An American Romance (1944), and Sorry, Wrong Number (1948). In the 1930s, she was the only Australian actor under a long-term contract to a film studio, Cinesound Productions. She subsequently became a lecturer and poet.

Life and career

Early life
She was born Shirley Ann Richards in Sydney, Australia, to an American father and New Zealand mother, and was raised in the suburb of Mosman and educated at Ascham School, Edgecliff.

Richards began acting on stage in amateur productions for the Sydney Players Club and worked as a receptionist at the photographic studio of Russell Roberts.

Cinesound
She was spotted in an amateur theatre production when selected for Cinesound Productions' Talent School, where she worked for six months. This led to her casting as Cecil Kellaway's daughter in It Isn't Done (1937) for director Ken G. Hall at Cinesound Productions.

Richards was a success with the public and critics, and Stuart F. Doyle, head of Cinesound, ordered Hall to put her under long-term contract so she would not be poached by a rival filmmaker such as F. W. Thring or Charles Chauvell. Hall later said, "I think that Shirley Ann would be the only artist before or since to be placed under term contract by an Australian film company." The contract was for 12 months with options.

"In Shirley Ann Richards I believe we have the ideal ingenue", said Hall at the time. "She is young, intelligent, photographs splendidly, and above all, responds quickly to direction. Her work in this film with a cast of famous professional players, headed by Cecil Kellaway, has astonished us all. She has great self possession, and yet her strongest appeal is her youthful freshness and feminine charm."

Hall used Richards in his next film, the logging adventure Tall Timbers (1937) where she romanced Frank Leighton.

She was the female lead in another adventure saga for Hall, Lovers and Luggers (1937), playing opposite American import Lloyd Hughes.

Richards' third film for Hall was playing the daughter of Bert Bailey in Dad and Dave Come to Town (1938).

Her final Australian feature was Come Up Smiling (1939), supporting Will Mahoney and directed by William Freshman, though produced by Hall.

In 1940, she appeared on stage in a production of Charley's Aunt at the Minerva Theatre. She also appeared in stage productions of The Ghost Train and Are You a Mason.

The following year, she appeared in her final Australian film, the war-time featurette 100,000 Cobbers (1942), directed by Hall.

American film career
Richards left Australia for Hollywood only a few days after the attack on Pearl Harbor in December 1941. She arrived with only $75, all that the government would allow her to take out of the country.

"I was prepared to do lectures or radio work if necessary", she later said.

Ken G. Hall had sent on some film featuring her to Carl Dudley, an American-based writer who had worked on the script for It Isn't Done and with whom Richards was to stay when he arrived, but it had gone missing. Nonetheless, Dudley invited screenwriter Fred Finkleberg to dinner to meet Richards; he recommended her to top agent Leland Hayward.

MGM
Within her first week in Hollywood, Richards was cast in a short, The Woman in the House (1942), which led to a contract with Metro-Goldwyn-Mayer. The studio saw her as a "young Greer Garson".

"I had an angel on my shoulder", she said later. "The studio respected my Australian credits and treated me like a star, but they cast me as 'Ann Richards', saying 'Shirley Ann, sounded too much like a Southern belle'". (Another reason was to avoid confusion with the actress Anne Shirley.)

In June 1942 she was given a small role in Random Harvest (1942) with Ronald Colman and Greer Garson. This was followed by a part in Three Hearts for Julia, and then a supporting role as an Australian nurse in Dr. Gillespie's New Assistant (1942).

In April 1943 she was given the most prestigious role of her career: the female lead in An American Romance (1944), a big-budget production from director King Vidor starring Brian Donlevy. News of this reached her parents in Australia half an hour before she received a telegraph from the army that their son Roderick, Richards' brother, was a POW in Borneo. However, the film ended up spending a lot of time in post-production and received mixed reviews when released. MGM recorded a loss on the film and Vidor refused to work for MGM again.

Richards tested for None But the Lonely Heart at RKO but lost it to June Duprez.

Hal Wallis and RKO
MGM was unsure what to do with Richards. "I loved MGM – except for the waiting – there were long periods when I wasn't being used", she commented later. Richards said the breaking point came when MGM refused to loan her out for a Cecil B. de Mille film.

She asked to be released from her contract. In April 1944 she signed with RKO, who had been impressed by her None But the Lonely Heart test, to make two films a year.

In July 1944 she signed with Hal B. Wallis, who announced he would put her in Love Letters and The Searching Wind. David O. Selznick also expressed interest in signing her. "I always wanted to be a free lance and now it looks like I'm a free lance and a contract player... isn't it wonderful?"

Wallis scheduled her to star opposite Barry Sullivan in Love Letters (1945). However, he then changed his mind and chose to use Jennifer Jones and Joseph Cotten in the lead roles; Richards was given a supporting part.

Ken Hall wanted her for Smithy back in Australia but she was unable to accept.

Wallis announced he would star Richards in an adaptation of the novel The Crying Sisters written by Ayn Rand and directed by Byron Haskin. However the film was not made.

RKO renewed their option on her in April 1945. They announced they would put her in None So Blind with Charles Bickford and Joan Bennett. It was eventually made without her as The Woman on the Beach.

Instead she supported Randolph Scott in Badman's Territory (1946). That year in an interview she said she thought her Australian accent might have held her back in Hollywood.  Wallis gave her the lead role in The Searching Wind (1946) with Robert Young, but the film was not successful.  In October 1946 Wallis announced Richards would make Paid in Full from a script by Robert Blees but the film was never made.  In November 1946 Hedda Hopper announced Cinesound wanted her to star in Botany Bay in Australia.  In 1947 she appeared in The Astonished Heart at La Jolla Playhouse alongside Dorothy McGuire.

Eagle Lion
Richards then appeared in two movies for Eagle Lion, Lost Honeymoon and Love from a Stranger. She then had the third lead in a popular film for Wallis Sorry, Wrong Number (1948).

In 1948 she was announced for a play Recessional by William Hurbert. Edmund Angelo bought the rights.

In April 1948 she told the Los Angeles Times she was determined to play younger parts as opposed to the more mature ones she had been doing.

In February 1949 it was reported that Byron Haskin was trying to get her to star in The Scarlet Empress to be shot in Mexico.

In 1949, it was reported she was trying to get up a film called Michelle as an independent producer.

Edmond Angelo
Richards retired in 1949 following her marriage to electronics engineer Edmond Angelo.

Angelo ran a successful consulting company and Richards and he raised three children together, Christopher, Mark, and Juliet.

In October 1951 it was announced she would make a film with Angelo, The Slasher, then do a play directed by him, Personal Triumph by Arthur Alsburg. There was also going to be a second film, You're So Dangerous, where Richards would play a social worker mistaken for a gangster's moll.

Eventually Richards appeared in The Slasher, produced and directed by her husband, which was retitled Breakdown (1952). The film was not a success and Richards appeared in no further dramatic films. Angelo decided to make no further films.

Later years
After her retirement, Richards ventured into painting and poetry, publishing several well-received volumes, including The Grieving Senses (1971) and Odyssey for Edmond (1991). She also wrote the verse play Helen of Troy in the 1970s, which Angelo and she presented on college campuses. They remained married until Angelo's death in 1983. Richards died in Torrance, California, on 24 August 2006.

Richards had a brother who was killed in a Japanese prisoner of war camp during World War II.

Richards and Australia
While in Hollywood, Richards often appeared at functions promoting Australian interests.

Richards attended the conference establishing the United Nations in San Francisco in 1945.

She returned to Australia in 1946 for a well-publicised holiday. She took back a pair of wicketkeeping gloves belonging to Bert Oldfield to C. Aubrey Smith in Hollywood.

Appraisal
Writer Tom Vallance said of Richards, "soft-spoken and sincere, she was at her best when conveying depths of wisdom, with a suggestion of passion stoically controlled." Author Stephen Vagg argued she "had an appeal similar to that of the young Olivia de Havilland – she looked like a good girl, but there was always a twinkle in the eye; virginal but with the promise of a lively honeymoon."

Credits

Filmography

Australian films 
 It Isn't Done (1937) as Patricia Blaydon
 Tall Timbers (1937) as Joan Burbridge
 Lovers and Luggers (1937) as Lorna Quidley
 Dad and Dave Come to Town (1938) as Jill
 Come Up Smiling (1939) as Eve Cameron
 100,000 Cobbers (1942, Short) as Catherine Starr

US films 
 The Woman in the House (1942, Short)
 Dr. Gillespie's New Assistant (1942) as Iris Headley
 Random Harvest (1942) as Bridget
 Three Hearts for Julia (1943) as Clara (uncredited)
 An American Romance (1944) as Anna O'Rourke Dangos
 Love Letters (1945) as Dilly Carson
 Badman's Territory (1946) as Henryetta Alcott
 The Searching Wind (1946) as Emily Taney Hazen
 Lost Honeymoon (1947) as Amy Atkins / Tillie Gray
 Love from a Stranger (1947) as Mavis Wilson
 Sorry, Wrong Number (1948) as Sally Hunt Lord
 Breakdown (1952) as June Hannum

Documentaries 
 Don't Call Me Girlie (1984, documentary) as herself

Unmade film 
His Bridal Night (1946) – with Dennis O'Keefe – the cast transferred over to Lost Honeymoon

Theatre
The Last of Mrs Cheyney (1936) – amateur production in Sydney
Haunted Houses (1936) – Sydney Players Club, St James Hall, Sydney
Charley's Aunt (1940) – Minerva Theatre, Sydney
Tonight at 8.30 by Noël Coward (1947) – Actors' Company, La Jolla

References

External links

 
Shirley Ann Richards at the National Film and Sound Archive
Ann Richards at TCMDB

1917 births
2006 deaths
American film actresses
Australian film actresses
Australian emigrants to the United States
Actresses from Sydney
Metro-Goldwyn-Mayer contract players
American people of New Zealand descent
People educated at Ascham School
20th-century American actresses
21st-century American women